Ireland's Eye is a ghost town on an island near Trinity in Newfoundland and Labrador, Canada. It is accessible only by boat. A way office was established in 1886. The first waymaster was Thomas Cooper. The schooner  ran aground here on 16 July 1929. There was a post office between 1941 and 1965. The population was 92 people in 1956. The community was "depopulated" on October 12, 1965.

References

See also
 Resettlement (Newfoundland)
 List of communities in Newfoundland and Labrador

Ghost towns in Newfoundland and Labrador
1965 disestablishments in Newfoundland and Labrador
Populated places disestablished in 1965